The college football recruiting class of 2020 refers to the recruiting of high school athletes to play college football starting in the fall of 2020. The scope of this article covers: (a) the colleges and universities with recruiting classes ranking among the top 20 in the country as assessed by at least one of the major media companies, and (b) the individual recruits ranking among the top 20 in the country as assessed by at least one of the major media companies.

Georgia, led by head coach Kirby Smart, had the top recruiting class according to Rivals.com, 247Sports, and On3. CBS Sports rated Alabama as the No. 1 class of 2020.

Defensive tackle Bryan Bresee was selected as the No. 1 recruit in the country by Rivals.com, USA Today, and 247Sports. Wide receiver Julian Fleming was selected by ESPN as the No. 1 recruit. Other notable players in the 2020 recruiting class included 2021 Heisman Trophy winner Bryce Young, who was rated as the No. 2 recruit by both Rivals.com and 247Sports.

Top ranked classes

Top ranked recruits

References

Recruiting class